The Minneapolis sound is a subgenre of funk rock with elements of new wave and synth-pop, that was pioneered by Minneapolis, Minnesota-based musician Prince in the late 1970s. Its popularity was given a boost throughout the 1980s thanks to Prince and groups he organized or produced, including the Time, Vanity 6, Apollonia 6, Sheila E., the Family, and the offshoots from his band the Revolution, Wendy & Lisa and Brownmark.  After leaving the Time, Jimmy Jam & Terry Lewis, Morris Day, and Jesse Johnson all moved on to successful careers. Minneapolis acts not directly associated with Prince also utilized this musical style, including Ta Mara & the Seen, Mazarati, the Jets.

According to the Rolling Stone Album Guide, "the Minneapolis sound... loomed over mid-'80s R&B and pop, not to mention the next two decades' worth of electro, house, and techno."

Those inspired by the style were not necessarily from Minneapolis, despite the subgenre's origins. Some artists who came from Minnesota were influenced by Prince's work. Others came from other parts of the United States, such as Flint, Michigan's Ready for the World.

Identifying characteristics
While the "Minneapolis sound" is a form of funk, it has some distinguishing characteristics:
 Synthesizers generally replaces horn sections of trumpets and saxophones, and are used more as accent than as fill or background.
 The rhythm is often faster and less syncopated than traditional funk, and owes much to new wave music.
 Guitars, while usually playing "clean" for rhythm parts, are frequently much louder and more aggressively processed during solos than in most traditional funk.
 The "bottom" of the sound is less bass-heavy than traditional funk; drums and keyboards fill more of the "bottom".
 The drums are more highly processed than in traditional funk, and on recordings are often replaced with a drum machine.

See also
 Twin Cities hip hop
 Music of Minnesota

Sources

References

External links
 Rashad Shabazz, How Minneapolis made Prince.  The Conversation, January 27, 2020.

Prince (musician)
Culture of Minneapolis
Funk rock